Carex banksii is a species of flowering plant in the sedge family, Cyperaceae. Carex banksii is native to South America and was first formally named by Francis Boott in 1839.

Four varieties are accepted:

Carex banksii var. abbreviata 
Carex banksii var. banksii
Carex banksii var. fonkii 
Carex banksii var. odontolepis

References

banksii
Flora of South America
Plants described in 1839